The Sunhak Peace Prize (선학평화상, 鮮鶴平和賞) was established to continue the legacy of Sun Myung Moon and is given biennially in Seoul, Korea, in recognition of individuals and organizations that have made enduring contributions to help resolve worldwide suffering, conflict, poverty, and threats to the environment.

Laureates are selected by the Sunhak Peace Prize Selection Committee, chaired by the former President of the European Commission and the first chair of the GAVI Board, José Manual Barroso. The Prize is organized by the Sunhak Peace Prize Foundation, chaired by Thomas G. Walsh.

Some sources report that the Prize is also awarded by the Universal Peace Federation (UPF), founded by South Korean Unification Church leader Hak Ja Han. Eligible laureates must be living at the time of the nomination in order to receive the award.

Purpose 
The Sunhak Peace Prize is awarded to those recognized and acknowledged as contributors to peace and human development. It was founded at the behest of Hak Ja Han Moon, the widow of Sun Myung Moon, to honor his ideals and achievements, as an alternative to the Nobel Peace Prize. Its concept of peace is based on the vision of ensuring a peaceful world, by advocating for sustainable human development, conflict resolution, and ecological conservation.

Vision and Mission 
The Prize's "Tenets of Peace" lays out three main objectives it advocates for:

 Respect for Human Development: Largely covering wider education and welfare, poverty relief, and disease eradication to respect human rights and human dignity.
 Conflict Resolution: An aspect that engages in the resolution of conflicts between people of various and opposing religions and their denominations, ethnicities, and nationalities.
 Ecological Conservation: Special emphasis can be found on the preservation of the natural environment's resources aimed at balancing the natural and human worlds sustainably.

History 
In 2013 the establishment of the Sunhak Peace Prize was proposed by Mrs. Moon, with the Sunhak Peace Prize Committee being inaugurated a year later.

The first award ceremony was held in 2015 and focused on climate change and the food crisis. It was awarded to Mr. Anote Tong, the former President of Kiribati, who led an international crusade against climate change, with particular focus on countries in the Pacific Region and to Dr. Modadugu Gupta, an Indian fisheries scientist who pioneered the aquacultural revolution, enriching diets and lives of the world's most impoverished.

The second award ceremony in 2017 highlighted the global refugee crisis and was awarded to two individuals: Dr. Gino Strada, a heart surgeon who provided free high-quality medical care for refugees and war victims, and Dr. Sakena Yacoobi who spearheaded Afghan refugee education programs with a special focus on girls and women.

In 2019 the third award ceremony placed emphasis on the worsening issue of global inequality. The award recipients on that occasion were Dr. Akinwumi Ayodeji Adesina and Ms. Waris Dirie. The ceremony recognised Dr. Adesina for greatly reducing poverty in Africa through the agricultural revolution in addition to leading Africa’s economic development through good governance. Ms. Dirie, as a human rights activist, raised Female Genital Mutilation (FGM) as an international human rights issue and assisted in passing a worldwide resolution banning its practice greatly contributing to restoring the dignity of girls and women in Africa.

In honor of the 100th anniversary of the birth of founder Rev. Sun Myung Moon, the fourth award ceremony (2020) includes a Founders’ Centenary Award and focused on the core principles of the founders’ peace vision, interdependence, mutual prosperity, and universal values, in selecting the laureates. Interdependence, mutual prosperity, and universal values are visions of peace based on principles of appropriate possession based on one’s conscience, the political model of an extended form of family centered on God, and universal ethics centered on true love. The Founders’ Centenary Award is being awarded to former UN Secretary-General Ban Ki-moon who has dedicated himself to leading the world toward sustainability. The 4th Sunhak Peace Prizes are being awarded to President Macky Sall of Senegal, a model of good governance in Africa, and former President of the Lutheran World Federation Bishop Munib A. Younan of Palestine, a pioneer of religious harmony.

Awarded items 
During the award ceremony, the laureate is awarded a medal and plaque and a monetary prize of 1 million US dollars.

Laureates

Peace Prize Laureates

Founders' Award Laureates

References

External links 
 Official website of the Sunhak Peace Prize

Peace awards